Monotoma is a genus of beetles in the family Monotomidae, containing the following species:

 Monotoma aegyptiaca Motschulsky, 1868
 Monotoma affinis Nikitsky, 1986
 Monotoma americana Aubé, 1837
 Monotoma angusticeps Reitter, 1911
 Monotoma angusticollis Gyllenhal, 1827
 Monotoma arida Casey, 1916
 Monotoma bicolor A. Villa & G.B. Villa, 1835
 Monotoma brevicollis Aubé, 1837
 Monotoma centralis Sharp, 1900
 Monotoma conicicollis Guérin-Méneville, 1837
 Monotoma conicithorax Reitter, 1891
 Monotoma diecki Reitter, 1877
 Monotoma emarginata Bousquet & Laplante, 2000
 Monotoma gotzi Holzschuh & Lohse, 1981
 Monotoma hindustana Motschulsky, 1868
 Monotoma hoffmanni Hinton & Ancona, 1935
 Monotoma inseriata Reitter, 1901
 Monotoma johnsoni Bousquet & Laplante, 2000
 Monotoma latridioides Sharp, 1900
 Monotoma longicollis Gyllenhal, 1827
 Monotoma madagascariensis Grouvelle, 1906
 Monotoma malyi Obenberger, 1914
 Monotoma mucida LeConte, 1855
 Monotoma munda Sharp, 1900
 Monotoma myrmecophila Bousquet & Laplante, 2000
 Monotoma perplexa Rey, 1889
 Monotoma picipes Herbst, 1793
 Monotoma producta LeConte, 1855
 Monotoma punctata Ragusa, 1892
 Monotoma punctaticollis Aubé, 1843
 Monotoma pusilla Sharp, 1900
 Monotoma quadricollis Aubé, 1837
 Monotoma quadrifoveolata Motschulsky, 1837
 Monotoma quadriimpressa Motschulsky, 1845
 Monotoma rhodeana Casey, 1916
 Monotoma rondanii Villa & Villa, 1833
 Monotoma seriata Reitter, 1901
 Monotoma specialis Nikitsky, 1985
 Monotoma spinicollis Aubé, 1837
 Monotoma subquadrifoveolata Waterhouse, 1858
 Monotoma testacea Motschulsky, 1845
 Monotoma texana Horn, 1879
 Monotoma uhligi Pal, 2000

References

Monotomidae
Cucujoidea genera